Ann Stephenson Cameron (born August 22, 1967) is an American former professional tennis player. She competed under her maiden name, Ann Stephenson, until her marriage to TV news reporter Alex Cameron.

Stephenson Cameron, who grew up in Columbia, Missouri, played collegiate tennis for the University of North Carolina while studying for a journalism degree. She later featured on the professional tour and reached a best singles world ranking of 247, with her best WTA Tour performance a third round appearance at Stratton Mountain in 1993.

ITF finals

Singles: 1 (0–1)

References

External links
 
 

1967 births
Living people
American female tennis players
North Carolina Tar Heels women's tennis players
Tennis people from Missouri
Sportspeople from Columbia, Missouri